Horwathia lineolata is a species of bugs in the tribe Mirini, family Miridae.

Distribution
This rare species is present in Austria, France, Germany, Liechtenstein, Italy and Switzerland.

Habitat
These bugs inhabit high-montane and subalpine heights and are endemic to the Alps and the Apennines.

Description
These small bugs have a black or dark brown scutellum and a brown membrane. The pronotum is yellowish with three dark brown markings. Hemelytra are yellowish, crossed by thin longitudinal brown lines (hence the Latin species name lineolata, from Latin lineola, diminutive of linea, meaning small line. Legs and antennae are reddish.

Biology
Adults can be found from May / early June. The larvae are herbivores and live on species of the genus Luzula, especially on Luzula campestris.

References

External links
 Insectoid

Miridae genera
Hemiptera of Europe
Insects described in 1862
Taxa named by Achille Costa
Mirini